Clermont is a city in Fayette County, Iowa, United States. The population was 586 at the 2020 census. Clermont is home to Montauk, the mansion of former Iowa governor William Larrabee, along with much historic architecture. Scenes for the movie The Straight Story were filmed here.

Geography
Clermont is located at  (42.999339, -91.654699) on the Turkey River.

Demographics

2010 census
As of the census of 2010, there were 632 people, 276 households, and 184 families living in the city. The racial makeup of the city was 98.3% White, 1.1% Asian, 0.3% from other races, and 0.3% from two or more races. Hispanic or Latino of any race were 1.4% of the population.

There were 276 households, of which 25.7% had children under the age of 18 living with them, 56.5% were married couples living together, 8.0% had a female householder with no husband present, 2.2% had a male householder with no wife present, and 33.3% were non-families. 27.5% of all households were made up of individuals, and 12% had someone living alone who was 65 years of age or older. The average household size was 2.29 and the average family size was 2.76.

The median age in the city was 45.8 years. 22% of residents were under the age of 18; 7.5% were between the ages of 18 and 24; 19.1% were from 25 to 44; 29.9% were from 45 to 64; and 21.5% were 65 years of age or older. The gender makeup of the city was 47.5% male and 52.5% female.

2000 census
As of the census of 2000, there were 716 people, 293 households, and 193 families living in the city. The racial makeup of the city was 97.35% White, 0.42% from other races, and 2.23% from two or more races. Hispanic or Latino of any race were 3.35% of the population.

There were 293 households, out of which 28.3% had children under the age of 18 living with them, 55.3% were married couples living together, 8.2% had a female householder with no husband present, and 33.8% were non-families. 28.7% of all households were made up of individuals, and 16.0% had someone living alone who was 65 years of age or older. The average household size was 2.44 and the average family size was 2.95.

In the city, the population was spread out, with 25.6% under the age of 18, 8.0% from 18 to 24, 24.6% from 25 to 44, 24.0% from 45 to 64, and 17.9% who were 65 years of age or older. The median age was 39 years. For every 100 females, there were 96.2 males. For every 100 females age 18 and over, there were 98.9 males.

The median income for a household in the city was $34,712, and the median income for a family was $39,792. Males had a median income of $27,250 versus $18,563 for females. The per capita income for the city was $14,276. About 4.8% of families and 8.1% of the population were below the poverty line, including 11.9% of those under age 18 and 9.6% of those age 65 or over.

Education

It is a part of the North Fayette Valley Community School District. It was previously a part of the Valley Community School District, which merged into the North Fayette Valley district on July 1, 2018.

Clermont previously had a school building, the former Clermont Public School, built circa 1913, which closed in 1990. Now named the Larrabee Building, it houses administrative offices of the city government and a library. Jason Clayworth and Charles Litchfield of the Des Moines Register described it as "richly decorated in marble".

Notable people
 George Botsford, American ragtime composer
 David B. Henderson, former Speaker of the United States House of Representatives
 William Larrabee, former governor of Iowa
 Don W. Strauch, Arizona mayor and state legislator

See also
Properties listed on the National Register of Historic Places:

Abraham Lincoln Statue and Park
Episcopal Church of the Saviour
Montauk
Union Sunday School

Notes

References

External links
 City of Clermont official website

Cities in Iowa
Cities in Fayette County, Iowa